Brian Blade (born July 25, 1970) is an American jazz drummer, composer, session musician, and singer-songwriter.

Early life

Blade was born and raised in Shreveport, Louisiana. The first music he experienced was gospel and songs of praise at the Zion Baptist Church where his father, Brady L. Blade Sr., has been the pastor for fifty-two years. In elementary school, music appreciation classes were an important part of his development and at age nine, he began playing the violin. Inspired by his older brother, Brady Blade Jr., who had been the drummer at Zion Baptist Church, Blade shifted his focus to the drums throughout middle and high school.

During high school, while studying with Dorsey Summerfield Jr., Blade began listening to the music of John Coltrane, Charlie Parker, Miles Davis, Art Blakey, Thelonious Monk, Elvin Jones, and Joni Mitchell. By the age of eighteen, Brian moved to New Orleans to attend Loyola University. From 1988 through 1993, he studied and played with most of the master musicians living in New Orleans, including Johnny Vidacovich, Ellis Marsalis, Steve Masakowski, Bill Huntington, Mike Pellera, John Mahoney, George French, Germaine Bazzle, David Lee Jr., Alvin Red Tyler, Tony Dagradi and Harold Battiste.

Career

The Fellowship Band and sideman work
In 1997, Blade formed The Fellowship Band with pianist Jon Cowherd, bassist Chris Thomas, saxophonists Myron Walden and Melvin Butler, guitarist Jeff Parker, and pedal steel guitarist Dave Easley.  The band released its debut album, Brian Blade Fellowship, in 1998, Perceptual (with guitarist Kurt Rosenwinkel) in 2000, Season of Changes in 2008, Landmarks in 2014, and Body and Shadow in 2017.

Reviewing the band's 2014 Landmarks album, John Kelman wrote:
As the Fellowship Band has grown, it has moved away from overt traditional references, even though they're an undercurrent throughout. Instead, as it explores milestones both inner and outer, Landmarks further speaks with the singular voice that the Fellowship Band has built upon since inception. Blending folkloric references, hints of church and spiritual concerns, jazz modality and countrified touchstones, Landmarks is the perfect name for Brian Blade & The Fellowship Band's fourth album; beyond its meaning to the group, it truly is yet another landmark recording in the core quintet's evolutionary travels. It may have come after a long gap in time, but that only makes it a wait all the more worthwhile.

While continuing to work with the Fellowship Band, since 2000 Blade has also been a member of Wayne Shorter's quartet. Blade grew up listening to Shorter's albums, and started playing with Shorter at 30 years old, along with Danilo Perez and John Patitucci. He has also recorded with Daniel Lanois, Joni Mitchell, Ellis Marsalis, Marianne Faithfull, Emmylou Harris, Billy Childs, Herbie Hancock, and Bob Dylan.

Singer-songwriter work
In 2009, Blade released Mama Rosa, his first album as a singer-songwriter, with songs dedicated to his grandmother and family. The album featured Daniel Lanois, vocalists Kelly Jones and Daryl Johnson, bassist Chris Thomas, guitarists Kurt Rosenwinkel and Geoffrey Moore, pedal steel guitarists Greg Leisz and Patrick Smith, and pianists Aaron Embry and Jon Cowherd. It was co-produced by Brian Blade and Adam Samuels. The live band includes Steven Nistor on drums.

On April 30, 2016, Blade played at the White House in Washington, D.C., as part of The International Jazz Day Global Concert.

Honors 
2013: ECHO Jazz Award "International Artist of the Year Drums/Percussion", for Quiver.
2013: Grammy Award for Best Jazz Instrumental Album for Trilogy (Concord), with Chick Corea.

Equipment
Blade uses vintage Gretsch, Ludwig, Sonor and Slingerland drums. He plays Canopus drums when touring in Japan. He has used a variety of cymbals over the years, including multiple ride cymbals made from Roberto Spizzichino, vintage A Zildjians, and often a 22" Zildjian K Constantinople Light Ride (discontinued model). His acoustic guitar is a mid-1950s Gibson LG-3.

Discography

As leader
 Brian Blade Fellowship (Blue Note, 1998)
 Perceptual (Blue Note, 2000) – recorded in 1999
 Season of Changes (Verve, 2008)
 Mama Rosa (Verve Forecast, 2009)
 Landmarks (Blue Note, 2014)
 Body and Shadow (Blue Note, 2017)
 Brian Blade & the Fellowship Band live from the archives Bootleg June 15, 2000 Blues Alley Washington D.C. (Stoner Hill, 2022)

As co-leader 
Trio with Wolfgang Muthspiel and Marc Johnson
 Real Book Stories (Quinton, 2001)
 Air, Love, and Vitamins (Quinton, 2004)

Duo with Wolfgang Muthspiel
 Friendly Travelers (Material, 2007)
 Friendly Travelers Live (Material, 2008)

Trio with Chick Corea and Christian McBride
 Trilogy (Concord, 2013) – Grammy Award for Best Jazz Instrumental Album
 Trilogy 2 (Concord, 2018) - Grammy Award for Best Jazz Instrumental Album

Trio with John Patitucci and André Marques
 Viva Hermeto (Borandá, 2014)

Trio with John Patitucci and Danilo Pérez
 Children of the Light (Mack Avenue, 2015)

Trio with Benjamin Koppel and Scott Colley
 Collective (ArtistShare, 2014)

Trio with Edward Simon and Scott Colley
 Steel House (ArtistShare, 2015)

Trio with Jeff Denson and Romain Pilon
 Between Two Worlds (Ridgeway, 2019)
 Finding Light (Ridgeway, 2022)

Quartet with Joshua Redman, Brad Mehldau and Christian McBride
 RoundAgain (Nonesuch, 2020) – recorded in 2019
 LongGone (Nonesuch, 2022) – recorded in 2007, 2019

Trio with Wolfgang Muthspiel and Scott Colley
 Angular Blues (ECM, 2020)

As group 
Yaya3
with Joshua Redman and Sam Yahel
 Yaya3 (Loma, 2002)

SFJAZZ Collective
 SFJazz Collective (Nonesuch, 2005) – recorded in 2004

Black Dub
with Trixie Whitley, Daniel Lanois and Daryl Johnson
 Black Dub (Jive, 2010)

As sideman 

With David Binney
 2000: Afinidad with Edward Simon (Red, 2005)
 2000: South (ACT, 2001)
 2004?: Welcome to Life (Mythology, 2004)
 2004: Océanos with Edward Simon (Criss Cross, 2007)
 2008: Third Occasion (Mythology, 2009)
 2010?: Graylen Epicenter (Mythology, 2011)

With Billy Childs
 Lyric: Jazz Chamber Music, Vol 1 (Artistshare, 2005)
 Autumn: In Moving Pictures: Jazz Chamber Music, Vol 2 (Artistshare, 2010)

With Kenny Garrett
 Black Hope (Warner Bros., 1992)
 Triology (Warner Bros., 1995)
 Pursuance: Music of John Coltrane (Warner Bros., 1996)
 Beyond the Wall (Nonesuch, 2006)

With Darrell Grant
 1993: Black Art (Criss Cross, 1994)
 1994: The New Bop (Criss Cross, 1995)
 Smokin' Java (Lair Hill, 1999)
 Truth and Reconciliation (Origin, 2007)[2CD]

With Norah Jones
 2000–01: Come Away with Me (Blue Note, 2002)
 2003–04: Feels Like Home (Blue Note, 2004)
 2015: Day Breaks (Blue Note, 2016)
 2018–19: Begin Again (Blue Note, 2019)
 2019: Pick Me Up Off The Floor (Blue Note, 2020)

With Kiyoshi Kitagawa
 2003: Ancestry (Atelier Sawano, 2004)
 2005: Prayer (Atelier Sawano, 2005)
 2005: Live at Tsutenkaku (Atelier Sawano, 2006)[DVD-Video] – live

With Daniel Lanois
 Shine (Anti-, 2003)
 Rockets (self-released, 2004)
 Belladonna (Anti-, 2005)
 Here Is What Is (Red Floor, 2007)
 Flesh And Machine (Anti-, 2014)

With Ron Miles
 2011: Quiver (Yellowbird, 2012)
 2013: Circuit Rider (Yellowbird, 2014)
 2019: Rainbow Sign (Blue Note, 2020)

With Joni Mitchell
 1997: Taming the Tiger (Reprise, 1998)
 1998: Painting with Words and Music (Eagle Rock, 1998)[DVD-Video]
 2002: Travelogue (Nonesuch, 2002)
 2006–07: Shine (Hear Music, 2007)

With Wolfgang Muthspiel
 2001: Real Book Stories (Quinton, 2001)
 2013: Driftwood (ECM, 2014)
 2016: Rising Grace (ECM, 2016)
 2018: Angular Blues (ECM, 2020)

With John Patitucci
 Communion (Concord, 2001)
 Songs, Stories & Spirituals (Concord, 2003)
 Line by Line (JVC Victor/Concord, 2006)
 Remembrance (Concord, 2009)
Viva Hermeto! (Borandá, 2014)
 Brooklyn (Three Faces, 2015)

With Joshua Redman
 MoodSwing (Warner Bros., 1994)
 Spirit of the Moment – Live at the Village Vanguard (Warner Bros., 1995) – live
 Freedom in the Groove (Warner Bros., 1996)
 Timeless Tales (for changing times) (Warner Bros., 1998)
 Elastic (Warner Bros., 2002)
 Momentum (Nonesuch, 2005)
 2006: Back East (Nonesuch, 2007)
 2008: Compass (Nonesuch, 2009)
 2012: Walking Shadows (Nonesuch, 2013)
 2017: Still Dreaming (Nonesuch, 2018)

With Wayne Shorter
 2001: Footprints Live! (Verve, 2002) – live
 2002?: Alegria (Verve, 2003)
 2002–04: Beyond the Sound Barrier (Verve, 2005)
 2010: Without a Net (Blue Note, 2013) – live
 2016: Emanon (Blue Note, 2018)

With Edward Simon
 2000: Afinidad with David Binney (Red, 2001)
 2006: Unicity (CAM Jazz, 2006)
 2008: Poesia (Cam Jazz, 2009)
 2010: Trio Live in New York (Sunnyside, 2013) – live
 2017: Sorrows & Triumphs (Sunnyside, 2018)

With Mark Turner
 1995: Mark Turner (Warner Bros., 1998)
 1998: In This World (Warner Bros., 1998)
 1999: Ballad Session (Warner Bros., 2000)

With Kenny Werner
 Democracy (Half Note, 2006) – live
 Lawn Chair Society (Blue Note, 2007)

With others
 Brad Mehldau, Introducing Brad Mehldau (Warner Bros., 1995)
 Emmylou Harris, Wrecking Ball (Elektra, 1995)
 Steve Masakowski, Direct Axecess (Blue Note, 1995) – recorded in 1994
 Jane Siberry, Maria (Reprise, 1995) – recorded in 1994–95
 Bob James Trio, Straight Up (Warner Bros., 1996) – recorded in 1995
 Steve Earle, El Corazón (Warner Bros., 1997)
 Bob Dylan, Time Out of Mind (Columbia, 1997) – recorded in 1996–97
 David Berkman, Handmade (Palmetto, 1998)
 Ryan Kisor, Battle Cry (Criss Cross, 1998) – recorded in 1997
 Dianne Reeves, Bridges (Blue Note, 1999)
 Bill Frisell, The Sweetest Punch (Verve, 1999)
 Marianne Faithfull, Vagabond Ways (Instinct, 2000)
 Rebekka Bakken and Wolfgang Muthspiel, Daily Mirror (Material, 2000)
 Chris Potter, Gratitude (Verve, 2001) – recorded in 2000
 Ralph Bowen, Soul Proprietor (Criss Cross, 2001)
 Rick Margitza, Memento (Palmetto, 2001)
 Joe Henry, Scar (Mammoth, 2001) – recorded in 2000
 Joel Weiskopf, Change in My Life (Criss Cross, 2002)
 David Berkman, Leaving Home (Palmetto, 2002)
 Charlie Haden, American Dreams (Verve, 2002)
 Herbie Hancock, Michael Brecker, and Roy Hargrove, Directions in Music: Live at Massey Hall (Verve, 2002) – live
 Danilo Pérez, ...Till Then (Verve, 2003)
 Lizz Wright, Salt (Verve, 2003) – recorded in 2002
 Helen Sung, Push (Fresh Sound New Talent, 2004)
 Tim Ries, The Rolling Stones Project (Concord, 2005)
 Bob Lanois, Snake Road (Cordova Bay, 2006)
 Mike Holober, Wish List (Sons of Sound, 2006)
 Debbie Deane, Grove House (RKM Music, 2007)
 Sam Yahel, Truth and Beauty (Origin, 2007)
 Alyssa Graham, Echo (Sunnyside, 2008)
 Rebecca Martin, The Growing Season (Sunnyside, 2008)
 Scott Colley, Empire (Cam Jazz, 2010)
 John Scofield, A Moment's Peace (Emarcy, 2011)
 Laura Veirs, Tumble Bee: Laura Veirs Sings Folk Songs for Children (Bella Union, 2011)
 Beth Orton, Sugaring Season (Anti-, 2012)
 Rolf and Joachim Kühn Quartet, Lifeline (Boutique, 2012)
 Davy Mooney, Perrier Street (Sunnyside, 2012)
 Matt Lemmler's New Orleans Jazz Revival Band, Ubuntu (SMartist, 2012)
 Shawn Colvin, All Fall Down (Nonesuch, 2012)
 Iron & Wine, Ghost on Ghost (4AD, 2013)
 Laura Veirs, Warp and Weft (Bella Union, 2013)
 Aga Zaryan, Remembering Nina & Abbey (Parlophone, 2013)
 Jon Cowherd, Mercy (ArtistShare, 2013)
 Antonio Sánchez, Birdman (Milan, 2014)
 Billy Childs, Map to the treasure: Reimagining Laura Nyro (Sony, 2014)
 Jenny Scheinman, The Littlest Prisoner (Sony Masterworks, 2014)
 Sarah McLachlan, Shine On (Verve, 2014)
 Joe Jackson, Fast Forward (Caroline, 2015)
 Joel Harrison 5, Spirit House (Whirlwind, 2015) – recorded in 2013
 Sadao Watanabe, Re-Bop (Victor, 2017)
 Debbie Deane, Red Ruby Stars (Modern Icon Recordings/Ropeadope, 2021)

References

External links
 Official site

 
 
 
  - interview at the North Sea Jazz Festival, 2015 
  - performing "King's Highway"

1970 births
Living people
Writers from Shreveport, Louisiana
Musicians from Shreveport, Louisiana
American jazz drummers
American jazz composers
American male jazz composers
Nonesuch Records artists
Columbia Records artists
Blue Note Records artists
Warner Records artists
Verve Records artists
Verve Forecast Records artists
Concord Records artists
American session musicians
20th-century American drummers
American male drummers
Grammy Award winners
Jazz musicians from Louisiana
21st-century American drummers
20th-century American male musicians
21st-century American male musicians
SFJAZZ Collective members